Midnight Whisper is a 2015 Chinese horror thriller film directed by Jiu Jiu. The film was released on October 30, 2015.

Cast
Abby
Guo Yunqi
Ni Musi
Song Jiahao
Han Feng
Wang Xiuhao
Chang Xiaoxiao

Reception
The film has earned  at the Chinese box office.

References

2015 horror thriller films
2015 horror films
Chinese horror thriller films